The Luxembourg Red Cross is the Luxembourg-based National Society of the International Red Cross and Red Crescent Movement.  The society was established on 8 August 1914 by Emile and Aline Mayrisch.  They persuaded the mayor of Luxembourg City, the commander-in-chief of the army and representatives of the three churches to sign the founding certificate. Its president is currently Grand Duchess Maria Teresa.  Michel Simonis is the managing director.

The Grand Duchess was the guest of honour at an event to celebrate the 20th anniversary of the Luxembourg Red Cross Bazaar in Limpertsberg in November 2016.

References

External links 
 Luxembourg Red Cross Homepage
 IFRC: Luxembourg Red Cross Profile

Red Cross and Red Crescent national societies
Medical and health organisations based in Luxembourg
Organisations based in Luxembourg City
Organizations established in 1914
1914 establishments in Luxembourg